is a Japanese football player, who plays for Kagoshima United FC as a midfielder.

Career
After attending Kindai University, Edamoto signed for Thespakusatsu Gunma, where he played first for the U-23 side, then went to their first squad.

In January 2014, he decided to move to Fujieda MYFC.

Club statistics
Updated to 5 January 2021.

References

External links
Profile at FC Ryukyu
Profile at Fujieda MYFC

1988 births
Living people
Kindai University alumni
Association football people from Kanagawa Prefecture
Japanese footballers
J2 League players
J3 League players
Thespakusatsu Gunma players
Fujieda MYFC players
FC Ryukyu players
Kagoshima United FC players
Association football midfielders